Cornelius Desmond may refer to:
 Cornelius Desmond (American politician)
 Cornelius Desmond (Irish politician)
 Connie Desmond, American sportscaster